Kuda Widanalage Shantha Bandara is a Sri Lankan politician, a member of the Parliament of Sri Lanka for national list from 8 January 2019.He was a member of the parliament for Kurunegala from 2010 to 2015.

References

1973 births
Living people
Members of the 14th Parliament of Sri Lanka
Members of the 15th Parliament of Sri Lanka
Members of the 16th Parliament of Sri Lanka
Sinhalese politicians